Emily Pangnerk Illuitok (1943–2012) was an Inuit artist.

Her work is included in the collections of the Musée national des beaux-arts du Québec and the Winnipeg Art Gallery

References

1943 births
2012 deaths
20th-century Canadian women artists
21st-century Canadian women artists
Artists from Nunavut
Inuit artists